is a 2005 Japanese television drama for Fuji TV. It is based on the story of Aya Kitō, who suffered from a degenerative disease and died at the age of 25.

The script is based on Aya's diary that she kept writing in until she could no longer hold a pen. The diary was later titled One Litre of Tears and sold over 1.1 million copies in Japan.

Plot

Fifteen-year-old Aya Ikeuchi is an ordinary girl, soon to be high school student and the eldest daughter of a family who works at a tofu shop. As time passes, unusual things start happening to Aya. She begins falling down often and walking strangely. Concerned about her health, Aya's mother Shioka takes her to a doctor; he informs Shioka that Aya has spinocerebellar degeneration, a rare disease where the cerebellum gradually deteriorates to the point where the victim cannot walk, speak, write, or eat. As cruel as the disease is, it does not affect the mind.

Episodes

Special episode
On April 5, 2007, Fuji Television aired a three-hour special of the series set half a year (2014-2015) after Aya's death, and focuses on Haruto Asō, who has now become a doctor at the same hospital Aya was treated in, and Ako Ikeuchi, Aya's younger sister who is now a nurse in training, while Rika, Aya's youngest sister, has just started high school. Haruto is caring for a 14-year-old female patient, Mizuki, who was bullied in school because of her spinocerebellar degeneration, and rejects therapy due to having lost her will to live. Haruto remembers how Aya fought her illness and lived her life with her disease, and is thus motivated to support Mizuki reappears in the episode using a number of flashbacks from the series and in new scenes.

Casts

Main cast
Erika Sawajiri - Aya Ikeuchi
Ryō Nishikido - Haruto Asō

Other cast
Naohito Fujiki - Hiroshi Mizuno (a doctor)
Hiroko Yakushimaru - Ikeuchi Shioka
Takanori Jinnai - Ikeuchi Mizuo
Riko Narumi - Ikeuchi Ako
 - Ikeuchi Hiroki
, Yuuki Miyoshi - Ikeuchi Rika (the latter played an older Rika in the last two episodes)
Sarasa Morimoto - Ikeuchi Rika in the special episode, in first year of high school.
 - Mari Sugiura (One of Aya's best friends)
Kenichi Matsuyama - Yuji Kawamoto (Aya's first love interest and the basketball club leader, who drifts apart from her when she falls ill)
Yuya Endo - Takeda Makoto (Yuji's friend in the basketball club)
 - Saki Matsumura
 - Kohei Onda
 - Keita Nakahara
Hiroshi Katsuno - Yoshifumi Asōu (Haruto's father)
 - Asumi Oikawa (Aya's roommate when she was in disability school, who has the same disease as Aya)
 - Kikue Oikawa (Asumi's mother)
Yuuki Sato - Keisuke Asōu (Haruto's brother)
 - Madoka Fujimura
 - Kiichi Takano (One of the volunteers at the disability school, who later marries the head teacher there)
Shigeyuki Satō - Nishino (Aya's homeroom teacher at the normal high school)
- Tomita (a high school student who likes Haruto & is jealous of Aya)
Anri Okamoto - Nagashima Mizuki (a 14-year-old, and the protagonist in special episodes).

Alternate versions
Indonesian Production House SinemArt's drama, titled Buku Harian Nayla (Nayla's Diary), supposedly plagiarizes 1 Litre of Tears. The series bears some striking resemblances, such as the protagonists' names. The series aired on RCTI as a special Christmas series. Comparisons between the two series have been drawn by the show's audience. The scenario was written by Serena Luna, aka Chevyra Edenia. Indonesian fans of 1 Litre no Namida have reported this admitted act of plagiarism to Fuji TV and Indonesian mass media, but there has yet to be a response from Buku Harian Nayla's creators. RCTI failed to credit or acknowledge Fuji TV and 1 Litre of Tears, from which the story is presumed to have been adapted, and noted that "This story is fictitious: the similarities of names, characters, places, and times are purely coincidental."

Amrita TV is to dub 1 Litre no Namida, and the Chinese drama Tears of Happiness is based on this drama.

A Turkish remake of this drama, titled Bir Litre Gözyaşı, aired on Kanal D in 2018.

Ratings

Source: Video Research, Ltd.

Broadcasts

Japan
 Original run: October 11, 2005 – December 20, 2005
 Network and Timeslot: Fuji TV, Tuesdays at 10:00-11:00pm
 OST by Susumu Ueda

Hong Kong
 Original run: October 15, 2006 – December 31, 2006
 Network and Timeslot: TVB Jade, Sundays at 10:30-11:30pm
 Theme song(s): "Stubborn" by Jason Chan (TV), Xiang Ai Bu Xiang Ai by Ivana Wong (Movie)

Singapore
 Original run: Nov 28, 2006 – Jan 2, 2007
 Channel and time slot: E-City, Mondays and Tuesdays, 11:00pm – 12:00am

Indonesia
 Original run: May 4, 2007 – May 18, 2007
 Network and Timeslot: Indosiar, Mondays to Fridays at 05:00-06:00 pm

Taiwan
 Original run: July 2, 2007 – July 18, 2007
 Network and Timeslot: Japan Entertainment Television, Mondays to Thursdays at 10:00-11:00pm

Malaysia
 Original run: August 4, 2007 – October 20, 2007
 Channel and time slot: 8TV, Saturdays, 06:00 pm – 07:00 pm

Thailand
 Original run: May 5, 2008 - June 9, 2008
 Channel and time slot: Thai Public Broadcasting Service, Mondays & Tuesdays, 08:30 pm – 09:30 pm

Philippines
 Original run: May 25, 2009 – June 19, 2009
 Channel and time slot: GMA Network, Weekdays, 10:15pm – 10:45pm
 Theme songs: "Walang Hanggan" by Wency Cornejo feat.

Vietnam
 Original run: September 3, 2012
 Channel and time slot: HTV3, Mondays to Thursday, 21h30 - 22h30 GMT+7
 OST by Susumu Ueda

Soundtrack

References

External links

1 Litre of Tears at Fuji TV 

Japanese drama television series
2005 Japanese television series debuts
2005 Japanese television series endings
Fuji TV dramas